HTO may refer to:

Places
 HTO Park a beach in Toronto, Ontario, Canada

Transportation
 East Hampton Airport, in New York, United States
 Hightown railway station, in England

Science and technology
 High tibial osteotomy
 High Temperature Oxide
 Hohmann transfer orbit
 Holocene thermal optimum
 Waco HTO, an American biplane
 Partially tritiated water

Business
 Hostile takeover
 Hellenic Tourist Organisation

Other uses
 Haupttreuhandstelle Ost, a Nazi state institution in occupied Poland
 Minica Huitoto, spoken in Colombia and Peru
 OTE, a Greek telecommunications company